Iñigo Llopis Sanz (born 13 November 1998) is Spanish Paralympic swimmer who represented Spain in the Summer Paralympic Games.

Career
Llopis competed in the men's 100 metre backstroke S8 event at the 2020 Summer Paralympics and won a silver medal.

Personal life
Llopis's father, Luis, is goalkeeping coach for Real Madrid CF.

References

1998 births
Living people
Sportspeople from San Sebastián
Medalists at the World Para Swimming Championships
Medalists at the World Para Swimming European Championships
Paralympic swimmers of Spain
Swimmers at the 2016 Summer Paralympics
Swimmers at the 2020 Summer Paralympics
Medalists at the 2020 Summer Paralympics
Paralympic medalists in swimming
Paralympic silver medalists for Spain
Spanish male freestyle swimmers
Spanish male backstroke swimmers
S8-classified Paralympic swimmers